Obereopsis longicornis is a species of beetle in the family Cerambycidae. It was described by Hintz in 1919.

Subspecies
 Obereopsis longicornis rufuliantennata Breuning, 1968
 Obereopsis longicornis longicornis Hintz, 1919

References

longicornis
Beetles described in 1919